The national parks of Rwanda are protected ecosystems and wildlife reserves located within the borders of Rwanda in east central Africa. In 2020, these protected natural zones include the Volcanoes National Park, Akagera National Park and Nyungwe Forest. Maintenance of the national park system, as well as tourism infrastructure and promotion of the parks, is managed by the Rwanda Development Board (RDB) with assistance from government ministries.

Each park protects a distinct ecosystem and variety of species. Bordering the Democratic Republic of Congo and Uganda, into which the Virungas volcanic mountain chain extends, Volcanoes National Park is the most heavily patrolled park in the world and the oldest in Africa. In combination with adjoining parks in the neighboring countries, it serves as the world's only habitat of the mountain gorillas, whose numbers have been increasing here over the past decade. Visitor numbers to the gorillas are strictly limited and passes must be purchased, often well in advance, from RDB. Golden monkeys also inhabit a separate portion of the park.

To the southeast along the Burundian border, Nyungwe National Park hosts many chimpanzees and various other primate species in a highland rainforest environment.

The eastern border of Rwanda, along Lake Victoria and Tanzania, is the location of Akagera National Park and protects a variety of African fauna in a savannah ecosystem, including giraffes, elephant, buffalo, baboons, gazelles and zebra. Lions also inhabited the park, but were exterminated by poisoning during and after the Rwandan genocide. However, in 2015, seven lions were reintroduced to Akagera, and the population has since increased to almost 40 individuals.

See also 
 Wildlife of Rwanda

References

 
Geography of Rwanda